Peter Laurence "Larry" Fitzpatrick was a Canadian soccer player that played in Canada and the United States.

Career
Fitzpatrick won back-to-back Dominion of Canada Football Championships with Verdun Park FC and Montreal Aldred in 1934 and 1935. He also played three years in the first American Soccer League.  He played 81 league games for the Providence Gold Bugs in 1928 and 1929.  He began the 1929–1930 season in Providence, but transferred to the Pawtucket Rangers after only sixteen games.   On May 18, 1929, he scored one of the two Gold Bugs’ goals in a 2–2 tie with the New York Nationals in the 1929 American Cup.  The Gold Bugs went on to win the cup with a 4-2 replay victory. He also played for Montreal Blue Bonnets and Montreal CPR Glen Yards in Canada. In 2017, as part of the "Legends Class" he was elected to the Canada Soccer Hall of Fame as a player.

References

External links
 / Canada Soccer Hall of Fame

American Soccer League (1921–1933) players
Pawtucket Rangers players
Providence Gold Bug players
1946 deaths
Association football forwards
Canadian soccer players
Year of birth missing